Amanda Waring (born Amanda Barton-Chapple) is an English singer, actress, comedian and activist. She played the title role in the 1985 West End production of Gigi, and is also known for roles in Outside Edge and All Creatures Great and Small.

Early life
Waring was born in London to parents Dorothy Tutin and Derek Waring, both famous actors.

Career
Cast in the title role of the 1985 West End production of Gigi, she was a featured performer at the 1985 Royal Variety Performance.

In 2003, Waring planned an Edinburgh Fringe show based on Joanne Harris' Chocolat, but following a late cease and desist communication from Disney, she reworked it into a more generic chocolate-themed show.

Activism
Inspired by the care received by her mother at the end of her life, Waring became an activist and researcher for dignity in end-of-life care.

She wrote and directed the 2005 short film What Do You See? on the topic.

Screen credits
Outside Edge
All Creatures Great and Small
Casualty
The Princess and the Pea

References

External links

Living people
Date of birth missing (living people)
People from West Sussex
People from Hammersmith
English musical theatre actresses
English stand-up comedians
English women film directors
Year of birth missing (living people)